Minuscule 870 (in the Gregory-Aland numbering), ε 104 (von Soden), is an 11th-century Greek minuscule manuscript of the New Testament on paper, with a commentary. The manuscript has no complex content. It has marginalia and was prepared for liturgical use.

Description 

The codex contains only the text of the Gospel of Luke (11:5-16:14) on 14 paper leaves (size ). The text is written in one column per page, 23-24 lines per page.

There is also a division according to the smaller Ammonian Sections, but without references to the Eusebian Canons. It contains lectionary markings at the margin for liturgical reading.

Text 
The Greek text of the codex is a representative of the Byzantine text-type. Kurt Aland placed the text of the codex in Category V.
It was not examined by the Claremont Profile Method.

History 

C. R. Gregory dated the manuscript to the 11th century. Currently the manuscript is dated by the INTF to the 11th century.

The manuscript was added to the list of New Testament manuscripts by Gregory (870e). Gregory saw it in 1886.

Currently the manuscript is housed at the Vatican Library (Gr. 2115, fol. 166-179), in Rome.

See also 

 List of New Testament minuscules
 Biblical manuscript
 Textual criticism
 Minuscule 869

References

Further reading

External links 
 

Greek New Testament minuscules
11th-century biblical manuscripts
Manuscripts of the Vatican Library